Yaylakonak is a town (belde) and municipality in the Adıyaman District, Adıyaman Province, Turkey. The village is populated by Kurds of the Balyan tribe and had a population of 1,736 in 2021.

References

Towns in Turkey
Populated places in Adıyaman Province
Adıyaman District

Kurdish settlements in Adıyaman Province